Time Bomb Recordings was a Laguna Beach, California-based independent record label, founded in 1995 by artist manager Jim Guerinot in a joint-venture agreement with Arista Records. In the following five years, the artist roster grew to encompass a variety of musical genres (punk, indie, rock-a-billy); generally falling under the label "alternative rock". When the Arista agreement expired in 2000, Time Bomb signed with BMG Distribution. The label has also existed mostly to administer its back catalog and is currently distributed by RED Distribution (whose parent, Sony Music Entertainment, absorbed BMG). Time Bomb continued to release new albums in physical form until 2007, with the release of Social Distortion's Greatest Hits compilation album. Social Distortion would later sign to Epitaph, and Time Bomb did not release any new music in over half a decade.

In 2014, Time Bomb was revived with the release of Summer Nationals, an EP of three song covers by The Offspring on iTunes and Spotify. The label has since released more music by The Offspring, including their 2015 number one hit "Coming for You", as well as the band's 2018 cover version of 311's "Down".

In 2019 Time Bomb Recordings was acquired by Concord Music Company

Former artists
 Amazing Crowns
 Animal Chin
 The Aquabats
 Ball
 Berlin
 Black Days
 Chlorine
 Crumbox
 Death in Vegas
 Disappointment Inc
 The Elevator Drops
 Indigo Swing
 Lionrock
 Litany
 No Knife
 The Offspring
 Quarashi
 Mike Ness
 The Reverend Horton Heat
 Screamfeeder
 Peter Searcy
 Starling
 Social Distortion
 Soul Circle
 Sunny Day Real Estate
 Tenderloin
 The Vandals
 The Waking Hours
 Wellwater Conspiracy

Compilations
 Hell Comes to Your House
 Idle Hands Soundtrack
  The Best of KROQ Almost Acoustic Christmas
 Live At The Hootenanny

See also
 List of record labels

References

External links
 Official site

American record labels
Punk record labels
Record labels established in 1995
Record labels disestablished in 2007
Record labels established in 2014
1995 establishments in California
2007 disestablishments in California
Record labels based in California
The Offspring
Social Distortion